Kherapara is a former assembly constituencies of Meghalaya, a north east state of India. It was also part of Tura (Lok Sabha constituency). It was abolished by the Delimitation of Parliamentary and Assembly Constituencies Order, 2008.

Members of the Legislative Assembly

See also
 West Garo Hills district
 Tura (Lok Sabha constituency)

References

Former assembly constituencies of Meghalaya
West Garo Hills district